The Windrush Compensation Scheme (Expenditure) Act 2020 (c. 8) is an act of the Parliament of the United Kingdom which establishes the financial authority to enable the Home Office to make compensation awards under the Windrush Compensation Scheme.

References

2020 in British law
United Kingdom Acts of Parliament 2020